Wellcamp is a rural locality in the Toowoomba Region, Queensland, Australia.

Geography

Toowoomba Wellcamp Airport is at 1511 Toowoomba-Cecil Plains Road. It services Toowoomba and the surrounding districts.

The Toowoomba Bypass passes through the locality from north to south, intersecting with Toowoomba–Cecil Plains Road for access to the Toowoomba Wellcamp Airport and to Cecil Plains.

History 
The locality was named by the Queensland Railways Department after a camp for workers constructing the Toowoomba–Hendon railway, which was beside a well. The line opened to Hendon on 11 March 1869.

Wellcamp Provisional School opened on 27 February 1899. On 1 January 1909, it became Wellcamp State School.

Wellcamp Methodist Church opened on Sunday 5 November 1905. It closed in 1932. It was located south of the Wellcamp State School at 101 Wellcamp Westbrook Road.

Wellcamp Airport opened in November 2014. It was built by Toowoomba engineering business Wagners, which owns and operates the airport.

Heritage listings 
There are a number of heritage-listed sites in Wellcamp:

 Wellcamp State School, 609 Drayton-Wellcamp Road

Education 

Wellcamp State School is a government primary (Prep-6) school for boys and girls at 609 Drayton-Wellcamp Road. In 2017, the school had an enrolment of 77 students with 7 teachers (6 full-time equivalent) and 5 non-teaching staff (3 full-time equivalent). In 2018, the school had an enrolment of 95 students with 8 teachers (6 full-time equivalent) and 5 non-teaching staff (4 full-time equivalent).

There is no government secondary school in Wellcamp. The nearest government secondary schools are Wilsonton State High School in Wilsonton to the east, Harristown State High School in Harristown to the east, and Oakey State High School in Oakey to the north-west.

References

Further reading

External links

Suburbs of Toowoomba
Localities in Queensland